Chaopraya University is a university located in Nakhon Sawan Province, Thailand. Founded in 1988, the university offers undergraduate and graduate studies in business administration, sciences, communication arts, law, education, and public administration. The university is planning to open several other undergraduate programs in 2007 which will include hotel management, performing arts, and multi-media games.

See also
 List of universities in Thailand

External links 
 

Universities in Thailand
Nakhon Sawan province
Educational institutions established in 1988
1988 establishments in Thailand